The WIDA Consortium (formerly World-Class Instructional Design and Assessment) is an educational consortium of state departments of education. Currently, 41 U.S. states and the District of Columbia, as well as Puerto Rico and the Northern Mariana Islands, participate in the WIDA Consortium. WIDA designs and implements proficiency standards and assessment for grade K-12 students who are English-language learners, as well as a set of proficiency standards and assessments for Spanish language learners. WIDA also provides professional development to educators and conducts research on instructional practices, as well as the results and use of the ACCESS and W-APT English language proficiency assessments.

WIDA was established in 2003 with a grant from the U.S. Department of Education to the Wisconsin Department of Public Instruction  for the purpose of creating English language proficiency standards and assessments. The purpose of such Enhanced Assessment Grants  is to support State activities designed to improve the quality, validity, and reliability of state academic assessments beyond the requirements for such assessments described in section 111(b)(3) of the Elementary and Secondary Education Act, as amended by the No Child Left Behind Act of 2001. The consortium originally began with Wisconsin, Delaware, and Arkansas, which were the sources of the acronym WIDA, although Arkansas dropped out. The acronym definitions ("Wisconsin-Delaware-Arkansas" and the acronym developed to match the new constituent states, "World Class Instructional Design and Assessment") are no longer used.

WIDA provides several assessments for use with English language learners. The W-APT (WIDA ACCESS Placement Test) is most often used as a screening test to determine the language level of students entering a school system. These results are used most frequently to determine if a student is eligible for ESL or ESOL services. The W-APT test has been in use since 2006. The ACCESS test is given yearly and the results are used to determine the student's growth and progress, as well as to inform instruction for the next year. This test has been administered annually in WIDA member states beginning in the 2005–06 academic year. The WIDA MODEL K-12 assessment is used in the U.S. and several other countries as a test of English language proficiency. The ACCESS test also has many accommodations to support language learners who have an IEP or a 504 plan. These accommodations are not intended to change what the test measures, but allow students with disabilities to participate in an appropriate manner. These accommodations are given on an individual basis, and should not interfere with the testing the student's knowledge. Some of these accommodations include: extended testing time, human reader for response items, and Braille.

In addition to its consortium member state partners, the WIDA project partners with the Center for Applied Linguistics (CAL) in Washington, D.C. and MetriTech, Inc. of Champaign, IL, and most recently, Data Recognition Corporation (DRC), Maple Grove, MN.

The WIDA Consortium administrative office is located in the Wisconsin Center for Education Research at the University of Wisconsin-Madison.

WIDA Test Types

Kindergarten W-Apt 
Assessment given to incoming kindergarteners to determine if they are English Language Learners (ELLs). The purpose of the test is for educators to determine if students would benefit from ELL programs that schools have to offer. Scores are usually marked in Speaking and Listening in low, mid, high, or exceptional proficiency.

WIDA Access 2.0 
Administered to K-12 students who have been identified as ELLs. It is given annually to monitor student's progress in learning English. The test covers the four language domains of Speaking, Writing, Listening. and Reading. the assessment is usually scored through the WIDA Language Proficiency levels 1-6.

WIDA Online Access 
Computer based test given annually to students grades 1-12. Based on student performances, the online test routes students to both easier and more challenging content. Students are tested in the four language domains.

References

University of Wisconsin–Madison
English as a second or foreign language